Agni Sakshi or Agnisakshi or Agni Satchi may refer to: 

Agnisakshi (novel), Indian novel by Lalithambika Antharjanam
Agni Sakshi (1982 film), Indian Tamil language film
Agni Sakshi (1990 film), Indian Telugu language film
Agni Sakshi (1996 film), Indian Hindi language film
Agni sakshi (1999 film), Indian Malayalam language film based on the novel
Agni Satchi, Indian Tamil language soap opera aired on Star Vijay
Agnisakshi (TV series), Indian Kannada language Soap opera aired on Colors Kannada
, Indian Telugu language soap opera aired on Star Maa